Surveyor is an unincorporated community in Raleigh County, West Virginia, United States. Surveyor has a post office with ZIP code 25932.

The community was named after nearby Surveyor Creek.

References

Unincorporated communities in Raleigh County, West Virginia
Unincorporated communities in West Virginia
Coal towns in West Virginia